LCS Group of Companies, also known as LCS Holdings Inc., is a Philippine conglomerate. The LCS Group is founded by Filipino politician Luis Crisologo Singson who serves as its chairman.

Ventures

Aviation
The LCS Group operates a charter airline known as Platinum Skies, which was incorporated in 2013.

Energy and mining
Satrap Mining Corporation is a subsidiary under the LCS Group founded in 2014. It operates and manages renewable energy power plants mostly in Ilocos Sur. It also has a partnership with Philippine National Oil Company (PNOC) regarding the exploration of use of renewable energy for off-grid areas.

Satrap Mining Corporation is a subsidiary under the LCS Group engaged in mining. It was established in 2014.

Finance
Through HalloHallo Skylark Lending, Corp., the LCS Group runs a loaning service known as Casha.

Telecommunications
The LCS Group through Gracia Telecoms provides telecommunications services in Mindanao. In 2018, the LCS Group expressed interest to participate in a government-sanctioned bidding which would enable it to become the third major telecommunications provider in the Philippines alongside Globe Telecom and Smart–PLDT. The conglomerate formed a consortium called Sears Telecom with TierOne Communications International. TierOne is backed by Chinese firm Fujian Torch Electron Technology, Singaporean company Miller Pte. Ltd., and Cambodia-based Southeast Asia Telecom. The consortium touted itself as the only bidder planning to use satellite internet access by deploying portable Wi-Fi hotspots connected via satellite. LCS was not among the three entrants to the bidding, which was eventually won by Mislatel, which renamed themselves as Dito Telecommunity.

Events
The LCS Group spent $15 million to host the 2016 Miss Universe pageant in the Philippines in January 2017, around $12 million alone spent to secure the hosting rights from the Miss Universe Organization.

References

Holding companies of the Philippines
Conglomerate companies of the Philippines